Malalamai, or Bonga (after the two villages in which it is spoken), is an Austronesian language of Madang Province, Papua New Guinea.

References

Ngero languages
Languages of Madang Province